The discography of Serbian and former Yugoslav rock band Riblja Čorba consists of 20 studio albums, 9 live albums, 6 Singles, 4 VHSes, 4 DVDs, 3 EPs, 13 compilation albums, and 1 box set. The list does not include solo material or side projects performed by the members.

The band considers EPs Trilogija 1: Nevinost bez zaštite, Trilogija 2: Devičanska ostrva and Trilogija 3: Ambasadori loše volje three parts of the studio album titled Trilogija, although all three were released separately. All songs from three EPs were released on the compilation album Trilogija.

Studio albums

Live albums

Extended plays

Compilation albums

Singles

Video albums

Books
Rok pesmarica - Riblja Čorba (1983)
Dvadeset godina Riblje Čorbe (2000)
YU rock legende 1. - Riblja čorba, Mirko Jakovljević (2002)
Pogledaj dom svoj anđele, Nenad Stevović (2005)
Čorbografija, Miroslav Milatović (2005)

External links
The complete Riblja Čorba discography
 

Rock music group discographies
Discographies of Serbian artists